The Fort Lauderdale Tarpons were a minor league baseball team that played in the Florida State League in 1928 and in the Florida East Coast League from 1940 to 1942. Located in Fort Lauderdale, Florida, they were affiliated with the Pittsburgh Pirates in 1940.

Year-by-year record

References

Baseball teams established in 1928
Defunct Florida State League teams
Pittsburgh Pirates minor league affiliates
Defunct baseball teams in Florida
1928 establishments in Florida
1942 disestablishments in Florida
Baseball teams disestablished in 1942